Joonee Gamboa (born Jose Espineli Gamboa Jr.; August 7, 1936) is a Filipino actor. As veteran actor, he appeared in more than 145 movies and television shows.

Life and career
Gamboa won the Best Supporting Actor in the 1977 Metro Manila Film Festival for the movie Burlesk Queen. He did movies such as Enter the Ninja (1981), Bayaning 3rd World (1999) with Ricky Davao and Cris Villanueva, and Feng Shui (2004) starring Kris Aquino. His other film credits include Iskul Bukol: 20 Years After (2008) and Ang Panday (2009) played by Bong Revilla.

Gamboa's TV projects include Ful Haus (2007) with Vic Sotto and Pia Guanio, and Totoy Bato (2009) played by Robin Padilla. He was included in the cast of Philippine TV series' Kahit Konting Pagtingin starring Angeline Quinto, Sam Milby and Paulo Avelino, premiered in ABS-CBN on January 28, 2013.

He is a resident of Malolos City. He has been part of Barasoain Kalinangan Foundation, Inc. community theater in Malolos, Bulacan.

Filmography

Television

Film

Magtanggol (2016)
Feng Shui 2 (2014)
El Presidente (2012)
Ang Panday 2 (2011)
Pak! Pak! My Dr. Kwak! (2011)
Ang Darling Kong Aswang (2009)
Ang Panday (2009)
Iskul Bukol 20 Years After: The Ungasis and Escaleras Adventure (2008) - Peseta Caretaker
Till I Met You (2006)
Ispiritista: Itay, May Moomoo! (2005)
La Visa Loca (2005)
Feng Shui (2004)
Lastikman (2003)
Ping Lacson: Super Cop (2000) – Father of Ping
Bayaning 3rd World (1999)
Burlesk King (1999)
Pepeng Agimat (1999)
Closer to Home (1995) 
Fortunes of War (1994)
Mario Sandoval (1993)
Okay Ka, Fairy Ko! (1991) - Narrator
Hukom .45 (1990) - Narrator
Kunin Mo ang Ulo ni Ismael (1990)
Kahit Wala Ka Na (1989)
Arrest: Pat. Rizal Alih – Zamboanga Massacre (1989)
Ambush (1988)
Saan Nagtatago ang Pag-ibig(1987)
G.I. Baby (1987)
Ultimatum: Ceasefire! (1987)
Ma'am May We Go Out (1985)
Sa Hirap at Ginhawa (1984)
Palengke Queen (1982)
San Basilio (1981)
Enter the Ninja (1981)
Aguila (1980)
Durugin Si Totoy Bato (1979)
Patayin Si Mediavillo (1978)
Burlesk Queen (1977)
 High Velocity (1976)
Tag-ulan sa Tag-araw (1975)
Cover Girl Models (1975)
Tinimbang Ka Ngunit Kulang (1974)
Dynamite Wong and T.N.T. Jackson (1974)
 Wonder Women (1973)
Stardoom (1971)
Beast of the Yellow Night (1971)
Santiago! (1970)

Awards and nominations
2003 Nominated FAP Award Best Supporting Actor Diskarte (2002)
1994 Nominated FAMAS Award Best Supporting Actor Mario Sandoval (1993)
1981 Nominated Gawad Urian Award Best Supporting Actor Aguila (1980)
1979 Nominated FAMAS Award Best Supporting Actor Pagputi Ng Uwak... Pag-itim Ng Tagak (1978)
1979 Won Gawad Urian Award Best Supporting Actor Pagputi Ng Uwak... Pag-itim Ng Tagak (1978)
1977 Won Metro Manila Film Festival Best Supporting Actor Burlesk Queen (1977)

References

External links

1936 births
Living people
Filipino male comedians
Filipino male film actors
Filipino male television actors
Filipino male voice actors
Filipino television personalities
Male actors from Bulacan
People from Malolos
People from Manila